Teresa Galindo (born 12 November 1970) is a Mexican beach volleyball player. She competed in the women's tournament at the 2000 Summer Olympics.

References

External links
 

1970 births
Living people
Mexican women's beach volleyball players
Olympic beach volleyball players of Mexico
Beach volleyball players at the 2000 Summer Olympics
Sportspeople from Mexico City